Daryl Thomas Logullo (October 23, 1966 – November 18, 2013) was an American e-commerce executive. He began in marketing in offline marketing roles in the early 1990s.

Early life
Logullo was from Jupiter, Florida, attended Jupiter Elementary School and Jupiter High School and played competitive amateur golf with future PGA professionals Billy Mayfair and Gary Nicklaus.

He graduated from Palm Beach Junior College/Palm Beach State College in 1986 and Florida State University College of Business in 1989 with a Bachelor of Science in Finance with a concentration in Corporate Finance and Investment Management.

During college, he discovered a fascination with data, metrics and analytics. He became a member of Gamma Lambda chapter of Delta Sigma Pi ΔΣΠ at Florida State University, one of the largest co-ed professional business fraternities with over 240,000 initiated members and distinguished alumni business leaders. He served from 1990 to 1994 as a Trustee of the Delta Sigma Pi Leadership Foundation.

Career
Logullo began his career in 1990 in the investment publishing and portfolio management niche where he was exposed to traditional offline marketing and direct response, including copywriting, DR radio and broadcast advertising, direct mail and other forms of promotional marketing. From 1990 to 1992, he first discovered early internet search engines, web directories and online services, including pay-based online services in 1991 Web Crawler, Prodigy and GEnie, precursors to dial-up internet America Online 1.0 for Microsoft Windows 3.1x, launched in 1993. He applied traditional direct response and other forms of offline marketing, including sales promotions, public relations, and email and merged them with the burgeoning growth of e-commerce, witnessing the U.S. online speculative boom of 1998 to 2000 later known as the Dot-com bubble.

From 1995 to 1999, he worked in corporate finance and investment banking niches serving small to mid-size businesses (<$100 mil cap) where he was active with public and private business financing such as private equity, Regulation D offerings, Reg A offering, bridge loans and other forms of venture capital. From 1996 to 1998—at the height the dot-com internet bubble—he was in leadership roles evaluating business funding, marketing planning, and strategic marketing strategies to support venture funding efforts and became exposed to the growing channels of the internet, and online marketing. Ever since he has concentrated on using the internet and online marketing to grow sales. Logullo was partner and co-creator of web start-up BusinessTalkRadio.com from 1998 to 2000, a now defunct website, which would become an early precursor to internet radio, web-based radio, streaming radio webcasting of local health, wealth and business talk shows. Since 1999, he has focused solely on online marketing and ecommerce.

Personal causes
Logullo was a bereaved father and advocate for stillbirth research and legislation in the United States and worldwide. In 2005, he and other parents in the State of Florida helped lobby the Florida Legislature to create legislation that later would be named Katherine's Law in the Florida House of Representatives and Florida Senate sponsored by State Rep. Juan-Carlos Planas and State Senator Sen. Stephen R. Wise.

The Law would be renamed by the Florida Legislative in 2006 in honor of his deceased daughter, Katherine E. Logullo (Born: 5/10/05 – Died: 5/8/05), and signed into law by Florida Governor Jeb Bush on June 9, 2006.

The Law is a current Florida health and vital statistics law allowing for the issuance of a birth certificate to any parent of a stillborn child born in the state of Florida, retroactive to the date of death of the child. The Law is Section 382.0085 of the Florida Statutes, recognized by the Florida Department of Health and State of Florida Vital Statistics.

The Logullo family efforts were further recognized in 2007 by Florida Department of Health's Katherine's Law official web page by commemorating a family logo used on State issued informational brochures for inquiries made on how to obtain an official state birth certificate.

Logullo was an active advocate and volunteer National Legislative Liaison with the MISS Foundation, assisting other parents in the U.S. with state stillbirth lobbying. Since 2007 he has assisted dozens of parents to help them effectively pass birth certificate legislation for stillborn children in the following 19 U.S. states: Mississippi, South Dakota, Arkansas, North Dakota, Montana, Rhode Island, California, Nebraska, Georgia, Oklahoma, New Hampshire, Alaska, Maine, Tennessee, Alabama, North Carolina, Pennsylvania, New York and Iowa.

In 2013, he volunteered assisting parents and families with legislation in the states of Kansas, West Virginia, Ohio, Illinois and Nevada.

Interests

In 2008, he co-produced a cinematic short video adaptation entitled The Bridge – A Father's Choice with freelance cinematographer Johnny Cook, inspired and adapted from the 2004 Academy Award Short Action Nominated film The Most. This short, inspirational and free adaptation went viral online and has been watched over 2.6 million times.

References

External links
 Jul 2013 – Why Marketing and Fulfillment Must Work Together
 Jul 2013 – The Crystal Ball to Higher Online Product Sales – Daryl Logullo
 May 2013 – 5 Trends of the Burgeoning Ecommerce Revolution – Daryl Logullo
 Apr 2013 – Trust in Data? Mysteries of Attribution Tracking – Daryl Logullo
 Jan 2013 – Landing Pages Tests from 700,000 Site Visitors – Daryl Logullo
 2012 Internet Retailer/IRCE Guest Speakers – Daryl Logullo
 Internet Retailer Web Design Conference – 2012 Presenters – Daryl Logullo
 Daryl Logullo – Multchannel Merchant Contributor
 MISS Foundation – Daryl Logullo, National Legislative Liaison Volunteer
 Katherine's Law – Florida Department of Health
 Aug 2012 – How to Make Live Chat Work – Daryl Logullo
 Multichannel Merchant – Nov 2012 – How to Make Live Chat Work – Daryl Logullo

1966 births
People from Jupiter, Florida
American marketing people
Florida State University alumni
2013 deaths